Humps Island is an island  long with two summits near the western end, situated  south-southeast of the tip of The Naze, a peninsula of northern James Ross Island, which lies south of the northeast end of the Antarctic Peninsula. It was discovered by the Swedish Antarctic Expedition under Nordenskjöld, 1901–04. This descriptive name was recommended by the UK Antarctic Place-Names Committee in 1948 following a survey of the area by the Falkland Islands Dependencies Survey in 1945.

See also 
 List of Antarctic and sub-Antarctic islands

References

Islands of the James Ross Island group